Hashim Qureshi (born October 1, 1953 in Lal Bazar, Srinagar, Jammu and Kashmir) is a pro-Kashmiri leader and one of the founding members of Jammu Kashmir Liberation Front (JKLF) and is now the Chairman of Jammu Kashmir Democratic Liberation Party (JKDLP), one of the main Kashmiri political organisations which strives to find a political solution to merge Kashmir with Pakistan through peaceful political activities.

Ganga hijacking 

Maqbool Bhat was the founding father of Kashmir's separatist movement and he wanted to highlight the Kashmir issue internationally. He masterminded the idea of a hijacking. He chose Hashim Qureshi for the hijacking, who along with his cousin Ashraf Qureshi hijacked an Indian Airlines plane on 30 January 1971 (Ganga) en route from Srinagar to Jammu and brought the plane to Lahore, Pakistan. Hashim Qureshi was 17 years old. The Indian Airlines flight was carrying 30 people including crew members. After landing at Lahore Airport, the hijackers demanded the release of about two dozen political prisoners of the JKNLF in Indian prisons, political asylum in Pakistan and a guarantee from the Indian government that their relatives in Srinagar would not be hurt in any way.

The hijackers were greeted by the Chairman of Pakistan Peoples Party, Zulfiqar Ali Bhutto, who would later become the Prime Minister of Pakistan. On February the 1st 1971 all the passengers and crew were sent back to India via Amritsar and the 'Ganga' was set on fire by the Pakistani ISI . The hijackers and Maqbool Bhat were firstly praised as heroes and freedom fighters (as this was the first instance Kashmiris had brought their cause to the attention of the World) but then they and hundreds of other members of JKNLF were arrested, interrogated in Shahee Qila, Lahore and Dolayee Camp near Muzaffarabad. Because they have been on parole of R&AW. Later six of them were tried in a special court of Pakistan under the charges of collaboration with the Indian intelligence services. They were Maqbool Bhat, G.M. Lone, Mir Abdul Qayyum, Mir Abdul Manan and the two hijackers Hashim Qureshi and Ashraf Qureshi. The case started in December 1971 and after a long trial in which 1984 prosecuting and 1942 defence witnessed were called was concluded in May 1973. All but Hashim Qureshi were cleared of all charges other than dealing with arms and explosives etc. Hashim Qureshi was sentenced to nineteen years' imprisonment. Maqbool Bhat submitted for this case a statement which is arguably the most detailed reflection of his political ideology, excerpt: "I can say without any hesitation that I have not designed any conspiracy nor have I been a part of any group of conspirers. My character has always been transparent and unambiguous. However, I have done one thing and that is the rebellion against ignorance, greed of wealth, exploitation oppression, slavery and hypocrisy. If the ruling class of Pakistan that is a product of imperialism and represented by the bureaucracy and military dictatorship of this country views this as conspiracy then I have no hesitation in accepting the charge". Ganga Case was carried out under special presidential orders of the then President of Pakistan Yahya Khan according to which the accused were denied the right to appeal against the decision of this special court. Despite many requests and protests in Azad Kashmir and Pakistan, the right to appeal for Ganga accused was not accepted. The right to appeal was restored only after the British Kashmiris warned several Pakistani ministers on their visits to Britain that the unlawful tactics of the Pakistani rulers to convict these Kashmiris would be exposed. Using this right, JKNLF filed an appeal against the Special Court's decision about Hashim Qureshi. But it took seven years before the appeal was heard at Supreme Court, which was composed of a full bench of three judges, where Hashim Qureshi was eventually also cleared.

The Pakistani authorities released Hashim Qureshi in 1980. He married the daughter of his maternal uncle in 1982. In 1985, the Inter-Services Intelligence (ISI) approached him to join hands. The ISI wanted to get young people from Kashmir, for training. They offered him money, land and other things. After long discussions of four months, he declined. He argued that Pakistan had also occupied Gilgit- Baltistan and Azad Kashmir, where there is no democracy. After that, the Pakistani authorities started hunting him; he escaped Pakistan and fled to The Netherlands. He had to leave his wife, who was then pregnant, and their two children. They joined him after four months with help from Amnesty International and other human rights organisations .

Formation of Jammu Kashmir Democratic Liberation Party 
Qureshi wrote articles and press releases to the leaders in Kashmir warning not to start an armed rebellion. He believed that the "freedom movement" of a country cannot be run by another country or foreign intelligence agencies. It has to be an indigenous movement, not one running at somebody else's behest. According to him weapons were the enemy of the Kashmiri people in this era and the Kashmiri rebellion would be called a terrorist movement instead of a freedom movement. After having read Mahatma Gandhi, Martin Luther King Jr., Nelson Mandela and others in jail, Hashim Qureshi, now was convinced that an armed struggle would only damage the Kashmiri cause and advocated a non-violent movement based on the principle of civil disobedience.

Because of JKLF's collaboration with the ISI and differences with the then chairman Amanullah Khan on his role in the Ravindra Mhatre case, he left the JKLF in 1993 and formed his own Jammu Kashmir Democratic Liberation Party (JKDLP) in 1994.

Maqbool National Welfare Association 
JKDLP laid the foundation of Maqbool National Welfare Association (MNWA) in 1994 with the specific aim to assist victims of militancy in Kashmir. Hashim Qureshi started this philanthropic institution while in exile in the Netherlands, named after Maqbool Bhat, whom Qureshi considered his Leader. In a place where NGOs have mushroomed by the dozen, MNWA was one of the first ones to be established for dealing with victims of the conflict – widows and orphans from the families of militants, who were not eligible to receive government aid. Initially, it was Qureshi's friends and family who were involved with MNWA. The first three centres were opened in downtown Srinagar – which had been a hotbed of militancy and subsequently had many widows and orphans. The centres taught the women it enrolled, after carefully screening their background, the art of making curtains and cushion covers. Qureshi and his family were also the first ones to buy the products. Today, the MNWA runs centres in almost all the districts of Kashmir and even in Jammu benefiting more than 15,000 women. In turn, some of its beneficiaries are now training others or running successful enterprises on their own. MNWA's other approach is educating orphans. The MNWA is fully staffed and manned by women, since it believes that women understand women better and also wants to encourage women to participate in the organisation's work and assume leadership roles. The MNWA today is headed by 24-year-old Anita Kumari, a Kashmiri Pundit. Hashim Qureshi's dream is to build an orphanage, a work centre for the women, a school up to 8th class for the orphaned children, one computer centre and a dispensary (in which doctors coming from outside will occasionally examine the patients) under the auspices of MNWA .

Return to Kashmir from exile 
Hashim Qureshi returned to India after an exile of almost 30 years on 29 December 2000. He was immediately arrested at New Delhi's Indira Gandhi International Airport and was produced before metropolitan magistrate Gulshan Kumar, who remanded him to judicial custody till 11 January 2001.
Hashim Qureshi filed Habeas Corpus, challenging the magistrate's order on the ground that his detention was illegal and that he could not be retried as per the law as he was already sentenced to life by a Pakistan court and had served a prison term for over nine years. He later on withdrew his writ petition, because according to his counsel K.K.T.S. Zeeshan Qureshi had conveyed his wish that he was very anxious to go back to Kashmir. He wanted to go as a free man, but as it is taking so much time he has decided to withdraw, said Tulsi. Adding, that he came back to India to be in Kashmir, with his people. As he is not well, he thought it would be better to continue the case in J&K. Later on he withdrew his Habeaus Corpus petition in the Delhi High Court and was flown to Srinagar, Jammu & Kashmir on 12 January 2001.

In Kashmir he was again charged for the 1971 hijacking with wrongful confinement, robbery, kidnapping and criminal conspiracy. He was also charged with hatching a criminal conspiracy with hanged JKNLF's founder Maqbool Bhat under a section of the Enemy Ordinance Act 3. This accuses him of being a Pakistani agent. Ironically he was charged under the same ordinance in Pakistan during the hijacking trial, which accused him of being an Indian agent. Maqbool Bhat and Hashim Qureshi are the only two Kashmiris who have been charged under the Enemy Ordinance Act in Pakistan as well as India.

Double jeopardy 
In Pakistan, Hashim Qureshi was sentenced under Section 3 of Official Secret Act for 14 years, under Section 342 for one year, under Section 435 for 2 years and under Section 120-B for 2 years in connecting of hijacking an Indian plane from Srinagar to Lahore. In all he was given 19 years imprisonment. In India cases were registered against him under Act 3 of Enemy Agent Ordinance, under Section 365, 120-B, 435 and 392. Whereas in another case Satnam Singh, who was one of the five Dal Khalsa men who hijacked the Indian Airlines plane on 29 September 1981 was acquitted upon his return from Canada in 2000 of all charges, because he had already been convicted and sentenced in Pakistan .

Leading advocates of India, including K.T.S Tulsi, Muzaffar Hussain Baig, Riyaz Khawar and Riyaz Jan have advocated that this case is a clear case of double jeopardy as a person cannot be tried twice for the same offence nor can he be punished a second time. Under Clause 7 of Article 20(2) of the Indian Constitution, a person cannot be prosecuted for the second time for the same offence even if the person has been tried for the same case in some other country. Still the J&K Government has re-opened this case against Mr. Hashim Qureshi and the prosecution has named around 30 witnesses in the case of which so far three witnesses have been produced in court ,, .

Supporters and well wishers of Mr. Hashim Qureshi have started an online petition campaign on OnlinePetition.com, stressing the Chief Justice of India to look into this matter. Mr. Hashim Qureshi has written a detailed write-up of his experience with the Indian judicial system, which can be read on his party's Facebook page , his personal Blog  and his party's website .

Political life in Jammu and Kashmir 
Hashim Qureshi spent a year in Hari Niwas jail in Srinagar and was released on bail in December 2001, because of health issues on the condition that he may not indulge himself in anti-state activities. He is still facing trial in the hijacking case and regularly has to attend court. Despite legal compulsions he has kept himself busy in finding a peaceful solution for the Kashmir issue. He was the only separatist Leader who attended two of the three Round Table Conferences organised by India and chaired by Indian PM, Manmohan Singh. He has also attended numerous conferences and debates about Kashmir, terrorism, democracy and human rights in the European Parliament in Brussels and at United Nations in Geneva.

The Jammu Kashmir Democratic Liberation Party (JKDLP) organises huge demonstrations, rallies and blood donation camps regularly and has proved itself a major and significant force in Kashmir's separatist politics. It still thrives to unite all the separatist parties to form a united platform. Recently while demonstrating against the Amarnath Land Transfer issue and human rights violations in Shopian, he was detained along with his party workers at different police stations in Srinagar. He wrote an extensive letter to the Indian media, on its silence about the Amarnath Land Transfer . Besides his political activities he is an ardent writer and is a permanent columnist for different newspapers including Kashmir's renowned English Daily, "Greater Kashmir" and its Urdu version "Uzma". He writes on social, cultural and environmental issues. He has written three books in Urdu and two in English (Kashmir: The Unveiling of Truth,  . His latest book is titled, 'Kashmir:The Undeniable Truth' .

See also
 Hurriyat and Problems before Plebiscite
 Syed Ali Shah Geelani
 Kashmir conflict
 2014 Jammu and Kashmir Legislative Assembly election

References

1953 births
Jammu and Kashmir politicians
Jammu Kashmir Liberation Front
Living people
People from Srinagar
Kashmiri militants
Indian expatriates in Pakistan